Erythema multiforme major  is a form of rash with skin loss or epidermal detachment.

The term "erythema multiforme majus" is sometimes used to imply a bullous (blistering) presentation.

According to some sources, there are two conditions included on a spectrum of this same disease process:
 Stevens–Johnson syndrome (SJS)
 Toxic epidermal necrolysis (TEN) which described by Alan Lyell and previously called Lyell syndrome[5].
In this view, EM major, SJS and TEN are considered a single condition, distinguished by degree of epidermal detachment.

However, a consensus classification separates erythema multiforme minor, erythema multiforme major, and SJS/TEN as three separate entities.

References 

5. Orphanet Journal of Rare Diseases 2010, 5:39 doi:10.1186/1750-1172-5-39

External links 

Drug eruptions